ESP LTD TA-200 is an electric bass model distributed by ESP. It is the mass-produced version of the custom signature model ESP Tom Araya, endorsed and used by Tom Araya of Slayer.

The four-string bass guitar features passive pickup set jointly designed and produced by ESP and EMG and a fixed bridge. Electronics are controlled by master volume, master tone and pickup balance knobs. Pentagram inlays decorate the rosewood fretboard.

See also
ESP Tom Araya

ESP electric bass guitars